Orangeville/Laurel Aerodrome  is located  west of Orangeville and just south of Laurel, part of Amaranth, Ontario, Canada.

See also
Orangeville/Castlewood Field Aerodrome
Orangeville/Brundle Field Aerodrome

References

Registered aerodromes in Ontario
Transport in Orangeville, Ontario
Buildings and structures in Dufferin County